George Jan Boyd (born 2 October 1985) is a former professional footballer. Initially deployed as a left winger in the early stages of his career, Boyd was used more frequently in an attacking midfield role as his career progressed.

Boyd started his career in the youth academy at Charlton Athletic, before joining Stevenage Borough of the Football Conference in 2001. He made his first-team debut for Stevenage in 2002, aged 17, and spent five years there, scoring over thirty goals. He signed for League Two club Peterborough United for a fee of £260,000 in January 2007, and won successive promotions in the 2007–08 and 2008–09 seasons. He joined Nottingham Forest on loan until the end of the 2009–10 season. He returned to Peterborough and was part of the team that won promotion back to the Championship during the 2010–11 season.

A loan move to Hull City followed for the remainder of the 2012–13 season, helping the club earn promotion back to the Premier League during the three-month agreement. The move was made permanent and he would go on to be a part of the Hull team that made the FA Cup final in 2014. He signed for Burnley, also of the Premier League, in September 2014, where he spent three seasons. During this time, Boyd gained coverage for his running statistics, running the highest average distance per game in the Premier League during the 2014–15 season. He helped Burnley back to the Premier League during the 2015–16 season. Boyd subsequently joined Sheffield Wednesday in July 2017 and made 50 appearances over two seasons there. He returned to Peterborough United for the 2019–20 season and then spent the following season at Salford City of League Two. Boyd announced his retirement from playing professional football in October 2021.

He also played for the England National Game XI team, who represent England at non-League level, from 2005 to 2006, earning six caps and scoring one goal. Boyd qualified to play for Scotland through his maternal grandfather. After playing for the Scotland B team in 2009, he earned his first cap at senior level in 2013.

Early life
Born in Chatham, Kent, Boyd grew up in Kent. He combined a course at North Hertfordshire College with playing football. During this time, Boyd worked in a sweet shop at Hitchin railway station to earn the money for his train fare to training.

Club career

Stevenage Borough
Boyd started his career as a part of Charlton Athletic's youth system at the age of 10. He was released by Charlton aged 15, and went on to briefly compete for Chatham Town's under-18 team in the Kent Youth League. Following his release from Charlton, Boyd was offered youth contracts by Bristol City, Farnborough Town and Stevenage Borough respectively, opting to join Football Conference club Stevenage on a two-year scholarship in 2001. Boyd made his Stevenage debut at the age of 17 during the 2002–03 season, playing the first-half in a 3–1 defeat against Margate at Broadhall Way on 14 December 2002. Boyd did not play again for the first team that season. The following season, Boyd played eleven times during the second half of the season under new manager Graham Westley, after impressing him during Boyd's involvement in the FA Youth Cup. Boyd made an impact as a second-half substitute in matches towards the end of that season, assisting all three of Stevenage's goals in a 3–1 victory over Tamworth, as well as scoring his first Stevenage goal in a 2–1 win against Northwich Victoria in April 2004.

As a result of his form towards the latter stages of the 2003–04 season, Boyd was a regular in the first team the following season, playing 37 matches and scoring three times as Stevenage made the Conference National play-offs. His first goal of the club's 2004–05 season came in a 4–1 victory against Northwich Victoria, scoring Stevenage's second just before half-time. Boyd was sent-off for the first time in his career in a match against Canvey Island, receiving a straight red card. During the team's 2005–06 season, Boyd started the season with three goals in five games, scoring twice against Woking in a 3–2 defeat, and once against Tamworth. He signed a new three-year contract at the club on 11 November 2005. Throughout the season, Boyd scored 12 times in 47 matches from midfield in all competitions.

Under the new management of Mark Stimson ahead of the 2006–07 season, Boyd was deployed in a more central role for the first time in a 2–1 defeat away at Tamworth on 2 September 2006, a match in which he scored Stevenage's solitary goal. In the club's next match, he scored his first competitive hat-trick in a 6–0 win against Stafford Rangers. Boyd scored four goals in a 7–0 victory over Merthyr Tydfil in the FA Trophy on 9 December 2006. In December 2006, Stevenage turned down an initial offer from Peterborough United for Boyd, but on 31 December both parties agreed a deal for the player and Boyd would officially sign for Peterborough on 8 January 2007 for a record Football Conference transfer fee of £260,000. Subsequently, he played his last match for Stevenage a day later in a 3–2 win over Aldershot Town on 1 January 2007, scoring twice. During the first half of the 2006–07 season, Boyd scored 15 goals in 27 matches in all competitions. During his time at Stevenage, Boyd earned the nickname "The White Pelé".

Peterborough United

Boyd made his debut for Peterborough in a 3–1 defeat away at Darlington on 13 January 2007, and scored his first goal for the club a month later in a 3–0 win against Wrexham on 10 February 2007. He came off the substitute's bench to score Peterborough's equaliser in a 1–1 draw at home to Boston United, a "superb 35-yard volley". He scored six times for the club during the second half of the 2006–07 season, playing 20 matches – including two goals on the final day of the season in a 3–3 draw with Rochdale. The following year, Boyd played regularly as Peterborough secured promotion to League One, scoring 15 times in 53 matches. During the season, he scored his second professional hat–trick in an 8–2 win against Accrington Stanley. As a result, he was named in the League Two 2008 PFA Team of the Year. He scored ten times in 53 matches in all competitions during the 2008–09 season as Peterborough earned back-to-back promotions into the Championship. Boyd was named in the League One PFA Team of the Year for the second successive year.

Boyd played in Peterborough's first match of the 2009–10 season, marking his first appearance in the second tier of English football, scoring from the penalty spot in a 2–1 defeat to Derby County at Pride Park. Boyd made a club record-equalling 124th consecutive appearance on 17 October 2009, scoring a last minute equaliser against Bristol City at Ashton Gate. He subsequently broke the record three days later in a match against Doncaster Rovers, before scoring twice in the following match against Scunthorpe United. Upon Mark Cooper's arrival as manager, Boyd was made team captain in January 2010. Peterborough stated that they had rejected a transfer bid for Boyd from fellow Championship club Middlesbrough in the January transfer window. The following day, Peterborough United director of football Barry Fry confirmed that Middlesbrough were in transfer talks over Boyd, although ultimately the two clubs failed to agree a fee for the player. Boyd scored 12 times in 37 appearances during the 2009–10 season.

Nottingham Forest loan
After Boyd's proposed move to Middlesbrough fell through, he joined fellow Championship club Nottingham Forest on loan on 2 March 2010, on an agreement until the end of the 2009–10 season. Peterborough chairman Darragh MacAnthony described the transfer as "one of the worst moments in his time at London Road". Boyd made his debut for Forest in a 1–0 victory over Swansea City on 6 March 2010, playing the whole match. He struggled for first team appearances during his loan spell there, and although it was expected that Boyd's move was to be made permanent in the summer, new Peterborough United manager Gary Johnson suggested "there's every chance" that Boyd could return to his parent club. Boyd made Forest's starting eleven for the first time in almost a month on the last day of the club's regular season; playing in a 2–2 draw away at Scunthorpe United and scoring Forest's second goal. It was to be Boyd's last appearance of the season for Forest, as he did not play in the club's unsuccessful play-off campaign. He made six appearances during his time at the club, scoring one goal.

Return to Peterborough
Boyd returned to his parent club ahead of the 2010–11 season, with Peterborough competing in League One following the club's relegation from the Championship the previous season. Boyd agreed a new three-year contract with Peterborough on 10 July 2010. He scored in Peterborough's first match of the 2010–11 season, a 3–0 win against Bristol Rovers on 7 August 2010. He went on to score five goals in five matches throughout February and March, scoring once against Colchester United. This goal was followed by braces against Exeter City and Carlisle United respectively, although Boyd missed the chance to complete his hat-trick in the latter match when he missed a 90th-minute penalty. Three days later, on 15 March 2011, Boyd scored twice against Sheffield Wednesday in a 4–1 victory at Hillsborough. He made it eight goals in eight matches when he scored in Peterborough's 2–2 away draw at Bristol Rovers. Boyd played in all three of Peterborough's play-off fixtures, which included the whole match in the 2011 League One play-off final at Old Trafford as Peterborough beat Huddersfield Town 3–0 to earn promotion back to the Championship. During the club's campaign, Boyd scored 17 goals in 51 appearances.

Ahead of the 2011–12 season, Peterborough rejected two bids for Boyd from Burnley. He played in the club's first match of the season on 6 August 2011, playing the whole match as Peterborough secured a 2–1 victory over Crystal Palace on their return to the second tier of English football. He went on to score eight times during the season, making 48 appearances in all competitions, as Peterborough consolidated their position in the Championship. At the end of that season, Boyd rejected the offer of a contract extension at Peterborough with one year remaining on his current deal. Consequently, he was placed on the transfer list as part of the club's new transfer policy. Boyd remained transfer-listed for the remainder of his time at Peterborough. Despite this, he continued to play regularly, opening the 2012–13 season by scoring two goals in his first three appearances. In October 2012, Boyd scored his fourth and fifth goals of the season in a 3–1 home win over Huddersfield Town on 23 October 2012. His second goal during the match was a dipping volley from just inside the Huddersfield half, a goal that was described as "world-class".

In January 2013, Peterborough rejected a transfer bid from Nottingham Forest for Boyd, an offer that club chairman Darragh MacAnthony described as "derisory". Eight clubs had enquired about Boyd during the transfer window. Towards the end of the 2013 January transfer window, on 29 January 2013, Peterborough accepted an offer for Boyd from fellow Championship club Crystal Palace. A day later, several other Championship teams had improved transfer bids accepted, including Nottingham Forest, who met Peterborough's £500,000 valuation. Boyd opted to speak to Forest and agreed terms with them on 31 January 2013, only for the club to pull out of the deal two hours before the transfer deadline, stating Boyd had failed a medical due to an "inconclusive eye test". Peterborough's Director of football Barry Fry criticised Nottingham Forest's owners for pulling out of the deal to sign Boyd, and chairman MacAnthony said, "He's played 300 matches and scored from the halfway line the other month, but Forest say he has an eyesight problem. The whole thing stinks. Alex McLeish wanted to sign him. It's the most ridiculous thing that's happened to me." Peterborough subsequently said that with Boyd's contract expiring in the summer, they would be prepared to offer him a new contract or let him leave on loan when the emergency loan window opened, with at least one club having signalled their interest in signing him on a loan agreement.

Hull City

Boyd  subsequently joined Championship club Hull City on loan until the end of the 2012–13 season on 21 February 2013, with a view to a permanent move. He made his debut two days after signing, coming on as a second-half substitute for Robert Koren in a 4–1 away defeat to Bolton Wanderers. Boyd's full debut came at home in the following match a week later, as he scored twice in a 5–2 victory over Birmingham City on 2 March 2013. After the performance, Hull manager Steve Bruce stated – "It was a wonder show. His work-rate and intelligence – he looked the real deal. I've always been a big admirer, but I didn't know he was that good. If he can keep performing like that then we've got some player on our hands". He played regularly for the remainder of the season, including in Hull's 2–2 home draw with Cardiff City on the last day of the season, the match that ultimately secured the club's promotion back to the Premier League. During his loan spell, Boyd made thirteen appearances and scored four times.

He signed for Hull on a permanent basis on 28 May 2013, joining on a two-year contract. He made his Premier League debut on the opening day of the 2013–14 season when he came off the substitute's bench in a 2–0 loss against Chelsea at Stamford Bridge. Boyd scored his first goal of the season, also his first in the top tier of English football, in Hull's 6–0 home win against Fulham on 28 December 2013, meeting Ahmed Elmohamady's cross to score the fourth of six-second-half goals. He scored the only goal of the game courtesy of a "towering header" as Hull secured a crucial 1–0 win over Swansea City on 5 April 2014; the victory helping move Hull "a substantial step closer to securing their Premier League status for another season". As well as helping Hull secure Premier League safety, Boyd also played in all seven of Hull's FA Cup matches that season, culminating in an appearance as a substitute in a 3–2 extra-time loss to Arsenal in the 2014 FA Cup Final at Wembley Stadium on 17 May 2014. Boyd made 39 appearances for Hull during the season, scoring twice.

Boyd remained at Hull for the start of the 2014–15 season and started in Hull's first appearance in a major European competition, also making his European debut, in a 1–0 first leg play-off round defeat away to Lokeren on 21 August 2014. The start proved to be only one of two appearances for Hull during the opening month of the season as manager Steve Bruce stated Boyd was nearing a move to fellow Premier League club Burnley. Ahead of the move being confirmed, Bruce stated "I wish him well. I've been in the game a long time and if all professional footballers were like George Boyd my job would be easy". During his year-and-a-half stay at Hull, Boyd made 54 appearances and scored six goals.

Burnley

The move to Burnley was confirmed on 1 September 2014, Boyd signing for an undisclosed fee "believed to be in the region of £3million" and on a three-year contract. He made his debut in a 0–0 draw against Crystal Palace at Selhurst Park on 13 September 2014, playing the whole match. Boyd scored his first goal for Burnley in the club's 3–1 defeat to West Ham United at Turf Moor on 18 October 2014, briefly halving the deficit when he reacted the quickest to latch onto Michael Kightly's cross. He scored three goals within the space of a month in December 2014 into January 2015 when he netted twice in two draws with Newcastle United, as well as scoring the first goal in a 2–2 comeback draw away at Manchester City. Boyd proceeded to score in the corresponding home fixture against Manchester City on 14 March 2015, his fifth goal of the season, when he "arrowed in a low half-volley" to secure a "famous" 1–0 win. He made 37 appearances during the season, scoring five times, as his first season at the club ended in relegation back to the Championship. Boyd finished the season as having covered an average of 7.45 miles per game, the highest average distance of any player in the Premier League that season. He was voted Burnley's Player of the Year at the end of the season, which Boyd described as a "great honour".

Boyd remained at Burnley for the 2015–16 season back in the Championship, starting in the opening day 1–1 draw away at Leeds United. He scored once during the first half of the season, scoring the winning goal in a 2–1 home victory against Milton Keynes Dons on 15 September 2015, a win that helped Burnley secure their fourth successive league victory. Boyd's first-half goal in Burnley's 2–1 away win at Birmingham City on 16 April 2016 helped move them to within two points of the top of the Championship. Burnley would go on to win the Championship title after securing a 3–0 away win at already relegated Charlton Athletic on the final day of the season, with Boyd scoring the second goal of the match when he "smashed the ball home from eight yards" shortly after half-time. He played 47 times and scored five goals as Burnley returned to the Premier League at the first time of asking.

Boyd started in Burnley's first game back in the top flight to open the 2016–17 season, playing the whole match in a 1–0 home defeat to Swansea City. His running statistics were once again highlighted during the season when he had run 58.3 miles in Burnley's opening seven fixtures, five percent more than Jordan Henderson in second place. He scored his first goal of the season in a 3–2 home win over AFC Bournemouth on 10 December 2016, latching onto Andre Gray's backheel before finishing low into the corner of the goal. Boyd scored in Burnley's crucial 1–0 victory against Stoke City on 4 April 2017, ending a run of seven games without a win. He played in 36 of Burnley's 38 Premier League fixtures that season as they secured safety after finishing in 16th position, scoring twice. Boyd was in contract talks with Burnley in April 2017 with his contract running out in the summer. Further talks took place in May, although ultimately no contract extension was agreed. He made 123 appearances during his three-year tenure at the club, scoring 12 goals.

Sheffield Wednesday
Boyd subsequently signed for Championship club Sheffield Wednesday on a free transfer on 3 July 2017, joining on a two-year deal until 2019. Despite dropping down a level to the Championship, Boyd described the move as a "no-brainer". He made his debut for Sheffield Wednesday on the opening day of the 2017–18 season, playing the opening 67 minutes in a 1–0 defeat away at Preston North End. Boyd suffered a shoulder injury in September 2017 that was initially described as "nothing serious", but would ultimately require two separate surgeries and keep him out of the first team for four months. He returned to the first team on 6 January 2018, playing 68 minutes in a 0–0 draw at Carlisle United in the FA Cup. Boyd scored his first goal for Sheffield Wednesday in the club's 3–1 victory over Reading at Hillsborough on 26 January 2018. He made 25 appearances during the injury-disrupted season, scoring three times. Having made the same number of appearances during the 2018–19 season, Boyd was released by Sheffield Wednesday on 5 May 2019.

Return to Peterborough United
Without a club ahead of the 2019–20 season, Boyd signed a two-year contract with former club Peterborough United, competing in League One, on 15 July 2019. Boyd started in the club's first match of the season, a 3–1 home defeat to Fleetwood Town on 3 August 2019, and went on to make 24 appearances that season. Due to a new £2.5million salary cap placed on all League One teams, Boyd was placed on the transfer-list by Peterborough on 28 August 2020. A month later, director of football Barry Fry stated he was "astonished" that the club had received no offers for Boyd. Boyd made his only appearance for Peterborough during the 2020–21 season on 6 October 2020, scoring in a 4–2 EFL Trophy victory against Fulham under-21s. He was released by the club on 13 October 2020, with Boyd stating he was "gutted" his time at Peterborough had concluded, as well as feeling frustration at not being able to play due to the new salary constraints.

Salford City
After his departure from Peterborough, Boyd signed a contract with League Two club Salford City on 3 November 2020, with the agreement running for the remainder of the 2020–21 season. He made his Salford debut in the club's 2–1 away defeat to Cambridge United on the same day as his signing was announced, coming on as a 70th-minute substitute in the match. Boyd played 13 times during his time at Salford, leaving the club upon the expiry of his contract in June 2021. In his last game for the club, a 3–0 win against Leyton Orient, Boyd missed a penalty which would have given Salford the lead.

Boyd announced his retirement from playing professional football on 28 October 2021.

International career

England C
Boyd was called up for the England C team in October 2005 and played in a European Challenge Trophy match against Belgium under-23s He subsequently played in two more matches in the same competition. He played against Italy in February 2006. He then scored his first goal for England C in a 4–1 win against Holland XI in November 2006 in the final match of the competition.

Scotland
Boyd was called up for the Scotland B team on 30 April 2009, after obtaining documentary proof that his maternal grandfather was born in Glasgow. Boyd started and subsequently scored in a 3–0 victory against a Northern Ireland B team, scoring the second goal of the match, giving a performance described as containing "flair and commitment". Boyd received his first call-up to the senior team on 7 March 2013, when he was named in manager Gordon Strachan's squad for the 2014 FIFA World Cup qualifiers against Wales and Serbia. He earned his first senior cap in a 2–0 away defeat to Serbia on 26 March 2013. Boyd started the match, playing the whole game at the Karađorđe Stadium in Novi Sad.

Style of play

Initially deployed solely as a winger, Boyd has been used in central midfield positions as his career has progressed. Boyd prefers to play "in the hole" because the position allows him to get more time on the ball. He has expressed his willingness to "play anywhere" to help the team, believing his versatility across the midfield and attacking areas to be one of his main strong-points. Under former Peterborough United manager, Jim Gannon, Boyd was given a "free-role", playing across the midfield and behind the strikers. Gannon believes that Boyd is at his best when he "is saved from doing defensive work that wingers may have to do", and as a result, during Gannon's time at Peterborough, was deployed just behind the strikers as part of a 3–4–1–2 formation. He is predominantly left-footed, and scores the majority of his goals with his left-foot, but is also comfortable using his right.

During his time at Stevenage, Boyd earned the nickname "The White Pelé" – this was due to his use of tricks, as well as the flair Boyd brought to the team. He has been labelled a creative and flamboyant midfielder, and described as "a player who will create goalscoring opportunities all game long". Boyd has stated that he considers assisting goals a "big part of his game". Boyd's creative nature is emphasised by the fact that he assisted over 50 goals for Peterborough during his time at London Road. Peterborough United manager Darren Ferguson has said that Boyd "has the tendency, and ability, to score goals from long distance", talking after Boyd's 35-yard volley against Boston United. This was further highlighted when Boyd scored from just inside the opposition's half in a win against Huddersfield Town in October 2012.

Since the introduction of the Premier League's statistical analysis that "covers every sprint over every blade of Premier League grass" during the 2014–15 season, Boyd's running statistics have gained significant coverage. Throughout the season, he covered an average of 7.45 miles per game, the highest average distance of any player in the Premier League that season. This resulted in Boyd being described as the Premier League's "most industrious" player, as well as being praised for his high fitness levels.

Personal life

Boyd has three children. He supports Crystal Palace, whom he used to watch regularly, and states former Palace striker Chris Armstrong was a player he aspired to play like.

Career statistics

Club

International

Honours
Peterborough United
League Two runners-up: 2007–08
League One runners-up: 2008–09
League One play-offs: 2011

Hull City
Championship runners-up: 2012–13

Burnley
Championship: 2015–16

Individual
PFA Team of the Year: 2007–08 League Two, 2008–09 League One
Burnley Player of the Year: 2014–15

See also
 List of Scotland international footballers born outside Scotland
List of sportspeople who competed for more than one nation

References

External links

1985 births
Living people
Sportspeople from Chatham, Kent
Footballers from Kent
English footballers
England semi-pro international footballers
English people of Scottish descent
Scottish footballers
Scotland B international footballers
Scotland international footballers
Association football wingers
Association football forwards
Association football utility players
Charlton Athletic F.C. players
Stevenage F.C. players
Peterborough United F.C. players
Nottingham Forest F.C. players
Hull City A.F.C. players
Burnley F.C. players
Sheffield Wednesday F.C. players
National League (English football) players
English Football League players
Premier League players
Salford City F.C. players
FA Cup Final players